WWE Battleground was a professional wrestling event produced by WWE, a Connecticut-based promotion. It was broadcast live and available only through pay-per-view (PPV) and the WWE Network. The event was established in 2013, debuting in October on WWE's pay-per-view calendar, replacing Over the Limit. In 2014, Battleground moved up to the July slot, becoming the promotion's annual July PPV. To coincide with the brand extension that was reintroduced in July 2016, the 2017 event was held exclusively for wrestlers from the SmackDown brand. Battleground was then discontinued as WWE reduced the amount of yearly PPVs produced after they had discontinued brand-exclusive PPVs following WrestleMania 34 in April 2018.

History
On the July 29, 2013, episode of Raw, WWE announced a new pay-per-view (PPV) titled Battleground to be held on October 6 that year at the First Niagara Center in Buffalo, New York. It replaced Over the Limit, which had been held annually in May from 2010 to 2012, but was going to be held in October 2013 before WWE decided to discontinue Over the Limit. The event returned in 2014, but was moved up to July, thus establishing the event as WWE's annual July PPV. In addition to PPV, the 2014 event was the first Battleground to air on WWE's online streaming service, the WWE Network, which launched earlier that year in February.

The 2016 event was regarded as the last PPV event featuring wrestlers from both the Raw and SmackDown brands, before the newly reinstated brand extension went into full effect; after SummerSlam that year, monthly PPVs became brand-exclusive, excluding the "Big Four" (Royal Rumble, WrestleMania, SummerSlam, and Survivor Series). The 2017 event was in turn a SmackDown-exclusive event. Battleground was expected to return in 2018 for the Raw brand; however, the event was taken off WWE's PPV lineup as after WrestleMania 34 that year, brand-exclusive PPVs were discontinued, resulting in WWE reducing the amount of yearly PPVs produced.

Events

See also 
 List of WWE Network events
 List of WWE pay-per-view events

References

External links 

 
Recurring events established in 2013
Recurring events disestablished in 2017